San Miguel Brewery, Inc. is a subsidiary of San Miguel Food and Beverage, Inc. and jointly owned with Kirin Holdings Co. Ltd. The company is the Philippines’ largest brewery with a market share of over 95% as of 2008, notably producing San Miguel Pale Pilsen (San Miguel Beer). The company also operates in China and Southeast Asia.

History

The first San Miguel Brewery, Inc. was founded as La Fábrica de Cerveza San Miguel in 1890 by Enrique María Barreto under a Spanish Royal Charter that officially permitted the brewing of beer in the Philippines and incorporated as the first San Miguel Brewery, Inc. in 1913. It was renamed San Miguel Corporation (SMC) in 1963, having grown into one of the Philippines' largest business conglomerates with core interests in alcoholic and non-alcoholic beverages, food, and packaging. The breweries operated as the beer division of San Miguel Corporation until 2007.

The present San Miguel Brewery, Inc. was incorporated on July 26, 2007, as a subsidiary of San Miguel Corporation and the domestic beer business was spun off into San Miguel Brewery, Inc. on October 1, 2007. In 2009, Kirin Holdings Co. Ltd. of Japan acquired 48.3% of San Miguel Brewery, Inc. from SMC for PHP 8.841 per share.

In 2010, San Miguel Brewery, Inc. acquired 100% ownership of San Miguel Brewing International Ltd, enabling San Miguel Brewery, Inc. to achieve full integration of its domestic and international beer businesses. San Miguel Brewing International oversees operations in Hong Kong (San Miguel Brewery Hong Kong), People’s Republic of China, Indonesia, Thailand and Vietnam.

On November 6, 2017, San Miguel Corporation announced the consolidation of its beverage businesses into San Miguel Pure Foods Company, Inc. through a share swap deal. San Miguel Pure Foods Company, Inc. will acquire 7.86 billion shares in San Miguel Brewery, Inc. from SMC. As a result, San Miguel Pure Foods Company, Inc. will own 51% of San Miguel Brewery, Inc. After the consolidation, San Miguel Pure Foods Company, Inc. will be renamed San Miguel Food and Beverage, Inc. The company held a special stockholder meeting on January 18, 2018, which approved the amendments to the Articles of Incorporation and the share swap transaction.

On March 23, 2018, the SEC approved the change in corporate name and amendments in the company's Articles of Incorporation.

Marker from the National Historical Commission of the Philippines
The marker of Fábrica de Cerveza de San Miguel was installed in 1950 at General Solano Street, San Miguel, Manila. It was installed by the Philippines Historical Committee (now National Historical Commission of the Philippines).

On September 29, 2015, during the 125th anniversary of the founding of San Miguel Brewery, the National Historical Commission of the Philippines installed a historical marker on the San Miguel Headquarters in Mandaluyong.

Philippine Stock Exchange (PSE)
San Miguel Brewery, Inc. became listed in the Philippine Stock Exchange (PSE: SMB) on May 12, 2008.

On January 2, 2013, trading of its stock was suspended when the rule on the minimum public ownership of listed shares took effect. On February 18, 2013, the company announced that its board of directors had approved the voluntary de-listing of the company from the stock exchange as well as a tender offer to buy back 94.24 million shares – representing the 0.61% public float. On April 24, 2013, the PSE board granted the petition for voluntary delisting filed by the company to take effect on May 15, 2013.

Brands
 San Miguel Pale Pilsen (San Miguel Beer) (5% ABV)
 San Miguel Premium All-Malt Beer (5% ABV)
 San Miguel Super Dry (5% ABV)
 San Miguel Flavored Beer (3% ABV)
 Cerveza Negra (San Miguel Dark Beer) (5% ABV)
 Red Horse Beer (San Miguel strong beer) (7% ABV)
 San Mig Light (5% ABV)
 San Mig Strong Ice (6.3% ABV)
 San Mig Zero (3% ABV) The Zero in the name stands for 0 sugar, rather than 0 alcohol.

See also

 San Miguel Beermen
 San Miguel Beermen (ABL)
 Beer in the Philippines

References

External links

 

Beer in the Philippines
Breweries of the Philippines
San Miguel Corporation subsidiaries
Drink companies of the Philippines
Companies based in Mandaluyong
Food and drink companies established in 1890
Beer in China
Beer in Hong Kong
Beer in Indonesia
Beer in Thailand
Companies listed on the Philippine Stock Exchange
Kirin Group
Food and drink companies established in 2007
2007 establishments in the Philippines